St. Peter is a Catholic church in Großhadern, which became part of Munich, Bavaria, Germany. It is part of the Diocese of Munich and Freising

Notable people 
Johann Georg Seidenbusch (1641–1729) was baptized in St Peter's Church.

References

External links 
 St Peter on St Canisius' website

Peter's Church, Hadern, Munich
Peter's Church, Hadern, Munich
Cultural heritage monuments in Munich